Balch Camp is an unincorporated community in Fresno County, California.

Lying deep within the foothills of the Sierra Nevada, Balch Camp is about 59 road miles, and  one hour; 50 minutes from Fresno Yosemite International Airport (via Bailey Bridge). Balch Camp is located almost 2 miles from Balch Power house, with which it shares its namesake, A.C. Balch.

Climate
Balch Camp has a hot-summer Mediterranean climate (Csa) typical of the Sierra Nevada foothills, with hot, dry summers and cool, wet winters.

References

Unincorporated communities in California
Unincorporated communities in Fresno County, California